The bacterial sroE RNA gene is a non-coding RNA molecule of 90 nucleotides in length. sroE is found in several Enterobacterial species but its function is unknown.

SroD and SroH were identified in the same bioinformatics search.

References

External links 
 

Non-coding RNA